Kristina Lilley is a Colombian-American actress.

Biography 

Kristina Lilley was born in New York City. She is the daughter of John Lilley, an American diplomat and Norwegian mother, Ellen Christensen, who was born in Bergen. Her family moved to Colombia when she was three years old.

She studied biology at the Pontifical Xavierian University before becoming an actress.  She speaks both Spanish, and English with a New York accent fluently.

In 2022, she played Gabriela Acevedo de Elizondo, in the second season of Pasión de Gavilanes.

Movies

Television

Personal life 
She married Óscar Suárez at a young age, divorcing in 2003 after having two daughters. In 2009, she was in a relationship with Colombian philosopher, Mauricio Lombana.

References

External links

Living people
Actresses from New York (state)
Colombian telenovela actresses
Naturalized citizens of Colombia
American emigrants to Colombia
American people of Norwegian descent
Colombian people of Norwegian descent
Pontifical Xavierian University alumni
Year of birth missing (living people)